Gunter Verjans (born 6 October 1973 in Tongres) is a former Belgian football player.

He won Belgian League titles with Club Brugge in 1996 and 1998.

References

External links
 

Belgian footballers
Belgium international footballers
Belgian expatriate footballers
Royal Antwerp F.C. players
Club Brugge KV players
Sint-Truidense V.V. players
SW Bregenz players
1973 births
Living people
C.S. Visé players
Belgian Pro League players
Expatriate footballers in Austria
Association football midfielders